Murray's Family Library was a series of non-fiction works published from 1829 to 1834, by John Murray, in 51 volumes. The series editor was John Gibson Lockhart, who also wrote the first book, a biography of Napoleon. The books were priced at five shillings; Murray's approach, which did not involve part-publication, is considered a fundamentally more conservative business model, and intention, than used by the contemporary library of the Society for the Diffusion of Useful Knowledge.

Original Library

Subsequent additions
In 1834 Murray sold out to Thomas Tegg. Further volumes were added to the Library, under Tegg's management. There was a total of 80 volumes, by 1847.

References
Scott Bennett, John Murray's Family Library and the Cheapening of Books in Early Nineteenth Century Britain, Studies in Bibliography Vol. 29, (1976), pp. 139–166. Published by: Bibliographical Society of the University of Virginia. Stable URL: https://www.jstor.org/stable/40371632

Notes

Series of books
1820s books
1830s books
1840s books
Lists of books